Swainsona sejuncta is a species of flowering plant in the family Fabaceae. It has pea-shaped flowers in a variety of colours, pink, cream, orange and mauve from spring to summer and is endemic to Queensland.

Description
Flowering usually occurs in spring.

Taxonomy and naming
Swainsona sejuncta was first formally described in 1993 by Joy Thompson and the description was published in  the journal Telopea.

Distribution and habitat
This species has a restricted distribution, found only in central western Queensland in the Carnarvon Range growing in sandy, clay-loans and basalt in eucalypt forests.

References

sejuncta
Fabales of Australia
Flora of Queensland
Taxa named by Joy Thompson